The Paul & Daisy Soros Fellowships for New Americans, founded by Paul Soros and Daisy Soros in 1997, is a United States postgraduate fellowship for immigrants and children of immigrants. In 2021, the Fellowship received 2,445 applications and awarded 30 Fellowships for a selection rate of 1.2%. Each Fellow receives up to $90,000 in funding toward their graduate education, which can be in any field and at any university at the US. The Fellowship, which honors the contributions of immigrants to the US, was founded in 1997. In 2010, the couple had contributed a total of $75 million to the organization's charitable trust.

Past fellows include United States Surgeon General, Vivek Murthy (1998 Fellow), the second-youngest Surgeon General to occupy the position, as well as the first of Indian descent. Other alumni include Iranian-American Ebola researcher Pardis Sabeti (2001 Fellow) and Fei-Fei Li (1999 Fellow), a Stanford professor and artificial intelligence expert.

The Fellowship has no restrictions based on field of study, and has supported graduate students in public policy, science, medicine, business, law, music, arts, humanities, and the social sciences. Applicants can be pursuing master's degrees, PhDs, JDs, MDs, MPHs, MD/PhDs, and other joint degrees, etc.

About the Fellowship

The Paul & Daisy Soros Fellowships for New Americans supports up to two years of graduate study in any field at any advanced degree-granting program in the United States. Each Fellow receives up to $25,000 a year in stipend support and up to $20,000 per year tuition support, allowing Fellows to receive as much as $90,000 over two years. Fellows attend two Fall Conferences in New York City designed to introduce the Fellows to one other and to examine their New American experience.

Mission 

The Fellowship provides opportunities for continuing generations of able and accomplished New Americans to achieve leadership in their chosen fields and to partake of the American dream. The program was established in recognition of the contributions New Americans have made to American life, and in gratitude for the opportunities the United States afforded by Hungarian immigrants to the United States, Paul and Daisy Soros.

Selection criteria

The Fellowship looks for applicants who have:
 Demonstrated creativity, originality and/or initiative
 Sustained accomplishment
 Promise of future significant contributions
 Planned graduate trainings is relevant future goals
 Commitment to Constitution and Bill of Rights

Eligibility 

New American Status: If an applicant was born abroad as a non-US citizen, then they must have been naturalized, be a green card holder, be adopted, or be a DACA recipient. As of 2020, anyone, regardless of documentation, who was born abroad and graduated from both high school and college in the US is eligible. For all applicants, regardless if they were born in the US or abroad, the parents must have been born abroad as non-US citizens unless the applicant grew up in a single-parent home.

Academic Standing: To be eligible, applicants must be entering graduate school or in the first two years of graduate school as of the application deadline. If a student is a PhD student, the Fellowship considers the master's part of the PhD. Fellows must be enrolled in full-time graduate studies during the first year of the Fellowship.

Age: Applicants cannot have reached or passed their 31st birthday as of the application deadline. The Fellowship makes no exceptions.

Paul & Daisy Soros Fellowship recipients

As of 2022, 743 students have been recipients of The Paul and Daisy Soros Fellowships for New Americans. The following institutions have had 30 or more fellows among their graduate student ranks.  

Some notable fellows include:

Pelkins Ajanoh, inventor and entrepreneur
Derrick Ashong, music entrepreneur
Lera Auerbach, composer
Andrei Cherny, founder of Aspiration
Amy Chow, physician, surgeon & former Olympic gymnast 
Eric Ding, epidemiologist, health economist, and COVID19 whistleblower
Abdul El-Sayed, author, former health commissioner of Detroit, former professor
Oscar De Los Santos, an elected official in Arizona 
Tali Farhadian, former federal prosecutor and current candidate for New York County District Attorney
Ron Huberman, Chicago education leader
Cyrus Habib, lawyer, former lieutenant governor of Washington state, former state senator in Washington
Nadine Burke Harris, California Surgeon General, doctor, author, and toxic stress expert
Rashad Hussain, US special envoy and coordinator for strategic counterterrorism communications
Sachin H. Jain, CEO of the CareMore Health System
Vikram Sheel Kumar, engineer, physician and entrepreneur
Fei-Fei Li, director of the Stanford Artificial Intelligence Lab and the Stanford Vision Lab
Lei Liang, composer
Mehret Mandefro, film/television producer, writer, and founder of the multimedia production company A51 Films
Patricia Miranda, lawyer and former Olympic wrestler
Vivek Murthy, former US Surgeon General (Obama administration), current US Surgeon General (Biden administration)
Parag Pathak, MIT economist 
Salvador Plascencia, writer
Paola Prestini, composer, cofounder and artistic director of National Sawdust and founder of VisionIntoArt
Vivek Ramaswamy, founder of Roivant
Julissa Reynoso, chief of staff to Dr. Jill Biden and former US Ambassador to Uruguay
Pardis Sabeti, computational biologist, medical geneticist and evolutionary geneticist
Sanjena Sathian, novelist
Nirav D. Shah, director of Maine CDC, former director of Illinois Department of Health
Jeff Sheng, artist, photographer & LGBT activist
Anthony Veasna So, writer
Konstantin Soukhovetski, pianist
Jeannie Suk, Harvard Law professor
Kao Kalia Yang, Hmong American writer and author of The Latehomecomer: A Hmong Family Memoir
Yung Wook Yoo, pianist and composer

References

Fellowships